Ernesto Paulo Ferreira Calainho known as Ernesto Paulo (born 2 February 1954 in Rio de Janeiro) is a Brazilian professional football manager.

Career
Since 1986 he coached the Rio Negro-RR, Tuna Luso, Fluminense (youth), Flamengo (youth) and Botafogo.

As a manager Brasil U20 in 1991, he won the South American Championship (Under 20). It was also the coach of the Brasil Olympic in the Pre-Olympic Tournament 1992 held in Paraguay. The team failed to qualify for the Football Tournament Barcelona Olympics.

He led the Brazil national football team in the September 11, 1991 match, when Brazil was defeated by Wales by 1-0 at the National Arms Park stadium in Wales. Later, he coached the União da Madeira, XV de Piracicaba, CRB, Vila Nova, União São João, Juventude, Botafogo-SP, Veranópolis, Juventus-SC, Campo Grande, Saudi Arabia Olympic, Cabofriense and América-RJ.

Titles
Flamengo
 Copa São Paulo de Futebol Júnior: 1
 1990
Brasil sub-20
 South American Championship (Under 20): 1
 1991

References

External links

1954 births
Living people
Sportspeople from Rio de Janeiro (city)
Brazilian football managers
Campeonato Brasileiro Série A managers
Tuna Luso Brasileira managers
Botafogo de Futebol e Regatas managers
Brazil national football team managers
C.F. União
Esporte Clube XV de Novembro (Piracicaba) managers
Clube de Regatas Brasil managers
Vila Nova Futebol Clube managers
União São João Esporte Clube managers
Esporte Clube Juventude managers
Botafogo Futebol Clube (SP) managers
Grêmio Esportivo Juventus managers
Campo Grande Atlético Clube managers
Associação Desportiva Cabofriense managers
America Football Club (RJ) managers